Sovetskoye or Sovet is a village in Jalal-Abad Region of Kyrgyzstan. Its population was 13,178 in 2021. Formerly a village within the rural community (ayyl aymagy) of Kengesh, it was merged into the new city of Bazar-Korgon in January 2021.

Population

References

Populated places in Jalal-Abad Region